The foreign relations of Ethiopia refers to overall diplomatic relationship of Ethiopia. The Ministry of Foreign Affairs oversees foreign relations and diplomatic missions of the country.

Ethiopia is one of few early African countries admitted to the League of Nations, becoming a member on 28 September 1923, and was one of the founding members of the United Nations. During the Scramble for Africa, Ethiopia had maintained its full sovereignty over European colonial power and fought the First Italo-Ethiopian War in 1895–96. However, the League did not protect in accord with the envisaged "collective security" of the country, resulted Italy's occupation of Ethiopia for 5 years (1936–1941). 

From 1950s, Ethiopia participated to UN peacekeeping missions such as in Korean War and Congo Crisis. Virtually, Ethiopia maintains diplomatic relations to most countries, and is non-permanent member of the UN Security Council.

History

Antiquity

Land of Punt
Punt (2500 BCE – 980 BCE) was predominantly a trading centre dominated by Ancient Egypt to Horn of Africa. Trading commodities includes exports of Egypt; one of the most essential was incense, which was mainly used for religious rituals for embalming corpse. Other were ivory, spices, hides and exotic animals that convey route to coast of Ethiopia, thus Ethiopia has been an integral part of Punt. Egyptian expedition to southeastern African region was generally commenced in the second millennium BC, after stabilizing relations with kingdoms of today's Sudan, the Kush, Napata and Meroë.

South Arabia

Some theorists hypothesized Ancient South Arabian people migrated out of Africa to the strait Bab-el-Mandeb when its sea level decreased to current status. When their civilization came to appear from 4th millennium BC, onward Mesopotamia and the Persian Gulf, adaptation of Semitic language was from end of Mediterranean, though they used Canaanite alphabet developed from Syria or Palestine during second millennium BC. Apparently, these languages similarity compared to Hebrew and Phoenician alphabets, even though lacked scholarly consensus. By 500 BC, it was widely spoken such as the Ge'ez language.

Writing system through inscription on stone often detailed historical rival kingdoms in the region, most notability the Saba, Qataban, Himyar, Hadhramaut, Ma'in and others. In 1959, American archeologists collected numerous artifacts and body of inscriptions in the area, belonging to primary sources. The inscription not only detailed about South Arabia, but also the early Ethiopian history associated with Kingdom of Aksum and its rulers.

Kingdom of Aksum
 
The Kingdom of Aksum has been a great power in classic Africa; once it has been referenced by Persian prophet Mani in the 3rd century and Greco-Roman trading guide Periplus of the Erythraean Sea in first century. Axum maintained well-defined foreign relations with powerful realms in the era. According to Stuart Munro-Hay witness, the Aksumite had several account of ambassadors that had delegation with neighboring powers. Occasionally, Aksumite contact with foreign powers also attested by archaeological or scarce finds.

Egypt
Aksumite relations with pre-Roman Egypt was ostensibly uncertain. However, it was considered that Aksumite contact were also existed during the fall of Ptolemaic dynasty with Cleopatra death in 30 BC. Few artifacts were uncovered from Egypt such as cippus of Horus given to Bruce, and illustrated by him, and a few amulet figurines of blue faience or cornaline found at various sites of Ethiopia. Other include the double-uraeus, perhaps brought from Meroë.

Another discoveries are an inscription of Ptolemy III copied by Kosmas at Adulis and ankh'-sign engraved on one of the stelae. During King Ezana's reign, he expedited to the Nile after Meroë was entirely sacked. After its successor Noba emerged, it behaved badly to consign Aksumite ambassadors punished with military expedition. An aggressive mistreatment was objected by tribes such as the Mangurto, the Barya, and the Khasa by asking support, either regarded Aksum would an aide of Noba or possibly a suzerain. Ezana's expedition also attacked Kasu, the remnants of Meroitic state. Nuba, Kasu, and Beja were integral to Ezana's kingdom. Meroitic artifacts have been found in Ethiopian location Addi Galamo (Atse Dera) such as bronze bowls, which was brought from Roman Egypt. It was possibly made up of diorite thumb-ring found by the BIEA expedition at Aksum, and corna line amulet of Harpocrates with typical double-uraeus of the Meroites.

South Arabia
Saba, Himyar and Hadhramawit kingdom commonly known as South Arabian states—had special relations with Ethiopia. Culturally, linguistically, and socially, Aksumite civilization completely inspired by those overseas. While Aksumite intervention to states generally uncertain, it was viable to have a military expedition beginning in 3rd century. During the period of GDRT and Adhebah reign, (’DBH), Aksumite commenced a military treaty with Saba and then with Hadhramawit in the first half of third century. 

During Adhebah period, Shamir called Himyar prince Dhu-Raydan sent military aid from Aksum. Later, Aksumite king adopted nominally "king of Saba and Himyar", asserting suzerainty. Foreign contact also continued during the fifth and early sixth centuries between the two sides of Red Sea. Byzantine scholar Procopius told the voyage of crossing Red Sea for five days and nights and that "the harbor of the Homeritae from which they are accustomed to putting to sea is called Boulikas", presumably somewhere near Mukha, and " at the end of the sail across the sea they always put in at the harbor of the Adulitae" at the reign of King Kaleb. 

Arabian titles were experienced in South Arabia during Kaleb's reign; after his viceroy deposed by Jewish Himyar king Yusuf Asar, Yemen was no longer requisite to Aksum. The event led Aksumite to decline its dominion. An inscription dated to 543 AD mentioned that the new king named Abraha dealing with the restoration of great dam at Marib, and mentioned embassies from various foreign countries such as Aksum, Rome, Persia and various Arab groups. Procopius noted that Abreha was subordinated by Kaleb, a period which unbeknownst to Abreha regaining the kingdom reputations and he received little damage.

Middle Ages

Foreign relations in the Middle Ages have impacted by an interaction with Iberian countries—Spain and Portugal—especially the latter had considerable power on internal affairs. Portuguese influence spanned from 1500 to 1672, they had an interest of spreading Jesuit order from 1556 to 1632. According to their narrative effluence, the Portuguese authors underscored their involvement to Ethiopia, but overturned to smoothly decay. Portuguese authors works notably Francisco Álvares, Miguel de Castanhoso, and  Pedro Páez survived to this day. Prester John, a fabulous Christian king, spurred the Portuguese to pursue Ethiopia whose kingdom they equates with Garden of Eden. According to the legend, he was born about 1460 and last seen in 1526. There is also speculation about his age where he lived for fifteen or twenty seven years beyond 1526.

Pero da Covilhã profoundly marched overland into the Ethiopian Highlands about the end of 1492 or beginning of 1493, characterized by conquest and superiority. He sent an information to Lisbon a few years later that contributed Vasco da Gama mobilisation to African southern cap into the Indian Ocean. The Portuguese navy almost dominated the coastline of Eastern Hemisphere.

In the early 15th century, Ethiopia sought to make diplomatic contact with European kingdoms for the first time since the Aksumite era. Atse Dawit I first made contact with the Republic of Venice by requesting for religious artifacts and craftsmen. A letter from Henry IV of England to the Ethiopian Emperor survives. In 1428, Yeshaq I sent two emissaries to Alfonso V of Aragon, who sent his own emissaries that failed to complete the return trip home to Aragon.

The first continuous relations with a European country began in 1508 with Portugal under Dawit II (Lebna Dengel), who had just inherited the throne from his father. In 1487, King John II of Portugal sent two emissaries to the Orient, Pero da Covilhã and Afonso de Paiva; Afonso would die on this mission. By the end of Middle Ages, the Ethiopian Empire was in a 13 year long war with neighboring Muslim states, and a Portuguese expedition force was sent from Goa, India to aid the Ethiopian Army due to an ongoing rivalry with  the Ottoman Empire, who provided logistical support to the Adal Sultanate.

Early modern period

Gondarine period

Since 16th century, Roman Catholicism and the Jesuits increasingly influenced on state power. Besides, the Oromo migrations had vital role in the northern Ethiopia. Among other Jesuit, Spanish Jesuit Pedro Paez had favorable relations to the Emperors of Ethiopia like Za Dengel and Susenyos I, the latter promulgated that Roman Catholicism state administrative to the Empire in 1622 on behalf of Orthodox Tewahedo Church, resulted in grave conflict for the years.

The reign of Emperor Fasilides in 1632 arranged this status by restoring Orthodox Tewahedo state leadership and expelled Jesuits from his land. After founding Gondar in 1636, Ethiopia then prospered again with the beginning of "Gondarine period" characterized as relatively peaceful governance. However, few Franciscan and Capuchin friars said to be lived during the 18th century such as Franciscan Giuseppe Maria di Gerusalemme, Remedius Prutky (who left credible records to the city). 

Architecture of this period was slightly influenced by the remnant Jesuits, but also the presence of Arab, Indians (brought by the Jesuits) as well as Turkish in Ottoman occupied northern area had involvement. One of the example is   castles in Fasil Ghebbi.

Post-Zemene Mesafint

Emperor Tewodros II reinstated the imperial power and foreign relations. His connection of Queen Victoria and other European leaders unfavorable when he sent unresponsive letter to the Queen, eventually leading to brief war with the British Empire. The British sent 13,000 soldiers, 26,000 men for logistical support and 40,000 animals including war elephants from India during their expedition, resulting in Tewodros suicide at Magdala in 1868. Not only modernized the empire, but he also paved the way of coherence the succession for subsequent emperors. Ethiopia was briefly isolated from world power in the post-Zemene Mesafint period; Emperor Yohannes IV faced Egyptian invasion as they laid linkage of Suez Canal to Massawa, and opening road between Addi Quala and Gundet used to penetrate the Ethiopian Empire. Yohannes IV on other side was reluctant to improve the road from the Ethiopian Highland to the coast of Red Sea. According to British assistant John Kirkham, he "preferred to keep his money hoarded up". Likewise, German traveller Gerhard Rohlfs asserted that he wanted to build churches rather than roads. Road working, on the sides, was completed by Swedish missionaries at Monkulu. British traveller Augustus B. Wylde supposed that Abyssinians were "in fear of foreign invasion" where lastly commented "I suppose they are right".

Wylde noted that the first Ethiopian diaspora took place in mid-1880s, who had been from Massawa to Europe, adapting European trousers. This was strictly outlawed by the Emperor. The empire nonetheless, was surged into modernization by foreign contribution, numerous missionary schools were expanded by Swedish Protestants at Monkulu and the French Lazarist at Keren, the later described by Wylde "a very useful education" with "very well conducted". Ethiopia had received broad European population in the 19th-century: Jean Baraglion of French origin who had lived for over a decade and according to Wylde, he enjoyed monopoly at Adwa. Despite rejoice, Baraglion encountered at least two rivals, a Hungarian named André who made an artificial limbs, and a Greek who have lived to Shewa over several years.

Menelik II
Ethiopia had strong diplomatic relations under Emperor Menelik II with Britain, France and Italy, the latter pursued hegemony to Ethiopian Empire after establishing colony in Eritrea (1882). The British and French rival with Italy due to insecurity with their respective protectorate in East Africa. However, both feared the process of Menelik's Expansions. In 1891, the British policy makers sent a circular note to the other world powers concerning the large portion of Nile Valley belonged to Ethiopia, "the activities and the pretension of the Negus were practically enough in themselves to bring the British to he support of Italian policy in East Africa."
 
On 2 May 1889, the Treaty of Wuchale was signed between Ethiopia and Italy with respective bilingual version. The treaty was signed after the Italian occupation of Eritrea and aimed to create friendship with both countries. The Amharic and Italian language, however confused by Article 17 in which Menelik denounced in 1893, resulting Italy's threatening over the status of newly formed boundary. 

In 1895, the First Italo-Ethiopian War began, ending with Italy's defeat at Battle of Adwa by Ethiopian troops who were assisted logistically by Menelik. By early 1900, European agencies opened legation in Addis Ababa and had huge impact on investment in the country's infrastructure (schools, banks, road, railway etc.).

Haile Selassie
During Haile Selassie coronation in 1930, emissaries from the United States, Egypt, Turkey, Sweden, Belgium, and Japan were also presented. Since then, he led the forefront diplomatic relations of Ethiopia with world powers.

In 1930s, Ethiopia faced Italian renewed imperialist design. Together with the failure of the League of Nations envision of Ethiopia's "collective security", Italy invaded Ethiopia again in October 1935, culminating in the Second Italo-Ethiopian War. In May 1936, Mussolini declared Ethiopia as part of Italian East Africa by merging with Eritrea and Somaliland. Haile Selassie fled to England's  Fairfield House, Bath, and delivered an address that made him a worldwide figure, and the 1935 Time Man of the Year.

On 10 June 1940, Mussolini declared war on France and Britain and attacked British and Commonwealth forces in Egypt, Sudan, Kenya and British Somaliland. In January 1941, the British army together with Arbegnoch ("the Patriots") and Gideon Force occupied Ethiopia. On 5 May, Haile Selassie with auspice of Ethiopian Free Forces entered Addis Ababa and reclaimed his throne while the war continued until November. After their defeat, the Italian began guerrilla offensive in Ethiopia that lasted until the Armistice between Italy and Allied armed forces in September 1943.

On 31 January 1942, the British and Ethiopia signed Anglo-Ethiopian Agreement which Britain recognized Ethiopian sovereignty, except military occupation of Ogaden with their colony in Somaliland and the former Italian colony of Somaliland, creating a single polity. Ethiopians discontent about the privilege of military administration of some south-eastern region until formal agreement signed on 19 December 1944 that ended British advantage in the Ethiopian regions. The Italian Republic signed peace treaty on 10 February 1947 that recognized Ethiopia's sovereignty with agreement to pay $25,000,000 in reparations.

In 1952, Eritrea federated with Ethiopia with majority vote in the United Nations and this attitude declined by 1961, culminating in the Eritrean War of Independence since armed forces formed such as the Eritrean Liberation Front (ELF).

Oppositions against Haile Selassie came to existence  with students began marching through 1960s and early 1970s, chanting "land for tiller" and embracing several Marxist-Leninist theme. Haile Selassie deposed on 12 September 1974 by officers of Ethiopian Army led by Aman Andom named Coordinating Committee of the Armed Forces, Police and Territorial Army. The committee renamed itself Provisional Military Administrative Council known as the Derg after abolishing the Ethiopian Empire in March 1975.

The Derg era
The Derg aligned itself with Soviet bloc—had similar Marxist Leninist policy on Ethiopia. The Derg suffered from internal insurgency and ambivalent relations with neighboring countries such as Eritrea and Somalia. In 1977, the Ogaden War was fought between the Derg supported by Cuba, Soviet Union and South Yemen, and Somalia with the United States and Egypt. Although ending on 15 March 1978, the relations between Ethiopia and Somalia marred with political dispute with involvement of the Ogaden National Liberation Front (ONLF) in relations of the disputed Ogaden region. 

By the 1990, the Derg and Soviet Union relations was deteriorated after Mengistu Haile Mariam banned the Ethiopian media to use the term glasnost and perestroika, defying Mikhail Gorbachev who was believed has not fondness for him. By early 1990, Mengistu helped emigration of the Ethiopian Jews to Israel by which many Jewish organizations and US Congress discerned Mengistu's task in the lobbying effort.

Federal Democratic Republic era

After defeating the Derg in 1991, the newly formed coalition the Ethiopian People's Revolutionary Democratic Front (EPRDF), led by President and later Prime Minister Meles Zenawi, experienced opposition from factions in Somalia as well as within the country; in May 1991, a pan-Islamist Al-Itihaad al-Islamiya (Islamic Unity) established to consolidate Somalia's power in the Greater Somalia. Relations with Eritrea was somewhat better intensified after its UN-sponsored  session from Ethiopia in May 1993.

Later in 1998, their relations was deteriorated after large-scale Eritrean mechanized force penetrated to Badme region, triggering the Eritrean–Ethiopian War. Both countries spent favorable amount of armaments ahead of the war and suffered reportedly 100,000 casualties combined as a direct consequence thereof, excluding indeterminate number of refugees. In December 2000, the two countries government signed Algiers Agreement which finalized the war and created binding judicial commissions, the Eritrea–Ethiopia Border Commission and the Eritrean–Ethiopian Claims Commissions, to oversee the disputed border and related claims. Since then, there was elevated tensions with border conflict and stalemate what is described "war footing" and "no-war-no-peace" with absence of foreign and domestic policy domination. This was ended after Prime Minister Abiy Ahmed came to power in 2018, signed the 2018 Eritrea–Ethiopia summit on 8–9 July.

Meles' government relations with Djibouti was friendly as Djibouti accessed Port of Djibouti to Ethiopia. Ethiopia had 90% imports arrived from Port of Djibouti and 95% of Djiboutian regional exports. In 2006, the Islamic Courts Union (ICU) virtually controlled the whole of southern Somalia and successfully united Mogadishu and imposed Shari'a law. With support of the Transitional Federal Government of Somalia, Ethiopia, under UN peacekeeping mission against War on Terrorism, attacked ICU. The ICU's split eventually led to the formation of Al-Shabaab, regrouping to continue the insurgency against TFG and Ethiopian military presence in Somalia. 

In May 2010, the Nile Basin Initiative was signed by five upstream countries such as Ethiopia, Tanzania, Uganda, Kenya, and Rwanda and Burundi as Egypt considerate as breach to the 1929 Anglo-Egyptian treaty that gave its right to share water. On 2 April 2011, the Grand Ethiopian Renaissance Dam (GERD) inaugurated  construction expected producing 15,000 megawatts of power within 10 years, spending 12 billion dollars of strategy to improve power generating capabilities. Egypt and Sudan continued objecting the filling of the dam in 2020.

Under Abiy Ahmed premiership since 2018, Ethiopia repleted its relations Somalia and Eritrea. In October 2018, Ethiopia signed peace agreement with the rebel faction ONLF ending 34 year long conflict since 1984. ONLF has clashed with the Ethiopian troops to contain vast oil and gas deposits, where Chinese oil firms developing two gas field in the area. In 2007, ONLF launched deadly attack against Chinese-run oil field which killed 65 Ethiopians and 9 Chinese nationals.

During the Tigray War, Ethiopia was allied to countries such as Turkey, United Arab Emirates and Iran who supplied drones to the Ethiopian government. With involvement of Eritrean Defence Forces (EDF), the US President Joe Biden designated six targets of sanction per Executive Order 14046, which was signed in September 2021.

Africa

Americas

Asia

Europe

Oceania

Ministry of Foreign Affairs
Foreign relations are upheld by Ministry of Foreign Affairs with the ability and capacity to marshal strategic partners for the continent and the region; to play a central role in Ethiopia's growth into a democratic developmental state and in the achievement of peace and stability in the Horn of Africa.

United Nations

Ethiopia was admitted to the League of Nations on 28 September 1923, becoming one of few African countries to do so due to not colonized by European powers during the 19th century Scramble for Africa. The League envisaged the membership for Ethiopia's "collective security" and protection against external attacks. The League however was unable to maintain Ethiopia's sovereignty as Japan invaded Manchuria, which Italy invaded Ethiopia in 1936.  

After its resumption of independence after World War II, Ethiopia was one of the founding members of the United Nations. Since the 1950s, Ethiopia has keeping UN peacekeeping missions toward Korean War and Congo Crisis and some African states like Rwanda and Burundi in 1990s. Ethiopia has now over 80,000 peacekeeping forces that are active.

The UN delivers development and humanitarian plan in Ethiopia with 28 representatives of funds and specialized agencies in the UN Country Team (UNCT). Ethiopia is non-permanent member of the UN Security Council which has close cooperation with the regional organizations the African Union and the Intergovernmental Authority on Development (IGAD).

European Union

Ethiopia has strong relations to the European Union while the EU funding financed by the European Development Fund (EDF) with objectives of resilience. Their relations has been defined by Cotonou Agreement article 8 to 13 with strong bilateral partners and dialogue regarding sustainable development on diverse aspect of the country.

In addition, the EU is the second largest trade partner for Ethiopia with total expenditure of 4.1 billion euro; exports representing 12% while Ethiopia exports representing 26% of worldwide exports in 2016. This has been compared to China (8%), Somalia (14%) and Kuwait (13%).

African Union

Ethiopia is one of founding African states of the Organization of African Unity (OAU) (now the African Union) on 25 May 1963 under Emperor Haile Selassie, headquartered in Addis Ababa. At the time, the organization evolved up to 54 African states, except Morocco.

The country is driving force of maintaining UN-AU peacekeeping missions, especially in the Horn of Africa region (Sudan and South Sudan), Darfur, South Sudan and Eritrea). The AU does not readily aggregate the preference of each member states. Therefore, every AU norms, institution and overlaps as consensus stated in the AU Constitution Act and its various decision and policy making, and implementation organs. As such, the AU offers for member states like Ethiopia to influence and impact on policy internally and regionally. Today, Ethiopian capital Addis Ababa is home of major organizations such as African Union, Pan African Chamber of Commerce and Industry, United Nations Economic Commission for Africa and African Standby Force.

See also
 :Category:Ethiopian diaspora
 Foreign aid to Ethiopia
 List of diplomatic missions in Ethiopia
 List of diplomatic missions of Ethiopia
 Ministry of Foreign Affairs

References

Further reading
 Amare Tekle, "The Determinants of the Foreign Policy of Revolutionary Ethiopia", Journal of Modern African Studies, Vol. 27, No. 3 (Sep., 1989), pp. 479–502
 Orobola Fasehun, "Nigeria and the Ethiopia-Somalia Conflict: A Case Study of Continuity in Nigerian Foreign Policy", Africa Spectrum, 17 (1982), pp. 183–193

External links
 Ministry of Foreign Affairs for Ethiopia's webpage
 A Tangled Political Landscape Raises Questions About African Ally of the U.S. by Michael Deibert, 12 June 2008
 Abdul Mohammed, "Ethiopia’s Strategic Dilemma in the Horn of Africa", Crisis in the Horn of Africa (Social Science Research Council website)
 "U.S. to Test Soviet 'New Thinking': Talks on Africa," The Christian Science Monitor, 4 May 1989.